John F. Naioti (1921-1990) was a professional football player in the National Football League. He graduated from Saint Francis University, Loretto, Pennsylvania in 1942.

He played in the National Football League for the Pittsburgh Steelers in 1942. He then went into the Army Air Corp during World War II. He was a first lieutenant navigator and a member of the 603rd Squadron. On August 16, 1944 he flew on a mission from Nuthampstead, England to Delitzsch, Germany. He completed his 32 combat missions on August 26, 1944 after a flight over Gelsenkirchen, Germany.

After completion of his military service, he returned to the Pittsburgh Steelers and played in 1945. In 1945 he also kicked four point after touchdowns.

According to his widow, he was offered a contract by the Pittsburgh Steelers for 1946 but decided to retire due to pain from his war injuries.

He is buried in Saint Mary's Cemetery, South 7 Street, Fulton, Oswego County, New York.

References

1921 births
1990 deaths
Saint Francis Red Flash football players
Pittsburgh Steelers players